Wolli Creek (formerley known as North Arncliffe) is a suburb in southern Sydney, in the state of New South Wales, Australia. It sits beside the Wolli Creek and Cooks River waterways. Wolli Creek is situated between the suburbs of Arncliffe and Tempe, 10 kilometres south of the Sydney central business district and is part of the St George area. Wolli Creek is in the local government area of Bayside Council.

History
The traditional owners of the land around the Wolli Creek Valley were the Bidjigal people (River Flat Clan) of the Eora Nation.

Wolli Creek was named after the waterway on its northern border.

The suburb was previously part of Arncliffe. Reuben Hannam was granted land in 1825 on the banks of Cooks river. Alexander Brodie Spark purchased land in 1826 and built Tempe house in 1836. It was named after 'Vale of Tempe', a beautiful valley in ancient Greek legend set at the foot of Mount Olympus. Tempe House, designed by John Verge, has a Georgian feel and is regarded as one of the great houses of Sydney.

Philanthropist Caroline Chisholm leased Tempe House as a boarding school for young women (1863–1865). The estate was known as Greenbank during this time and presented an ideal location for Chisholm's work. She remarked on the spacious and lofty rooms and the 'fine large and open orchard of fruit trees, intersected by wide and shady walks'.

In 1884 the estate was sold to the Sisters of the Good Samaritan for use as a charitable refuge for women. The Sisters added the impressive St Magdalen's Chapel (1888), which is believed to be the work of Sheerin & Hennessy, an important firm of Sydney architects, who designed the Archbishop's Residence and St Patrick's College at Manly.  The neo-Gothic style Chapel is of major cultural significance. It is now deconsecrated and has been restored as part of the Discovery Point redevelopment. Tempe House is now listed on the Register of the National Estate.

The area became predominantly industrial until a redevelopment was planned in the late 1990s. The new suburb was to be called North Arncliffe, but residents in the area petitioned the council to conduct a vote to select a better name. Wolli Creek was the most popular choice. Wolli Creek railway station opened in 2000. Wolli Creek was officially declared a suburb in 2002.

Heritage listings 
Wolli Creek has a number of heritage-listed sites, including:

 1 Princes Highway: Tempe House and St Magdalenes Chapel

Commercial/Retail area

Once industrial, Wolli Creek was redeveloped in the 2010s into a high-density residential and commercial area. Close proximity to the Sydney CBD and Sydney Airport, and well connected public transport services, along with the expansive parkland and attractive riverside setting, make it a popular residential location.

The main retail precinct is the Village Square, which is directly opposite the Wolli Creek station entrance and contains a wide array of restaurants and cafés, a pharmacy, barber and other shops. Other amenities in the area include an Asian grocery in the village square, as well as an Aldi supermarket, Woolworths and a Dan Murphy's liquor store.

Wolli Creek is home to two hotels: Novotel Sydney International Airport and CKS Sydney Airport Hotel.

Demographics
Compared to the national average of 14.4%, 48.5% of the population were aged between the ages of 25 and 34. The most common countries of birth were: China (24.7%), Australia (21.7%), Mongolia (4.9%), Brazil (4.3%), Indonesia (3.4%) and India (2.9%). English at home, was spoken by only 24.7% of people. Other languages spoken at home included Mandarin 24.2%, Cantonese 5.9%, Mongolian 4.6%, Portuguese 4.1% and Indonesian 3.1%. The most common responses for religion were No Religion 41.9% and Catholic 15.5%. 97.3% of residents live in apartments. The average number of people living in each household was 2.4.

Transport

The Princes Highway links Wolli Creek north to Tempe and the Sydney central business district and south to Arncliffe and Rockdale. The M5 South Western Motorway, with entrances and exits at nearby Arncliffe, runs south-west towards Liverpool and north-east towards Botany and the city.

Wolli Creek railway station is a railway hub and connects to the Illawarra line and Airport & South Line on the Sydney Trains network.

The 348 bus route operates from Wolli Creek station to Prince of Wales Hospital via Tempe, St Peters, Kensington and the University of New South Wales. The 422 bus route travels from Kogarah to Wolli Creek, then continues to Railway Square.

Recreational facilities
Cahill Park is located along the Princes Highway and Gertrude Street, fronting the Cooks River. Facilities offered include playground equipment, electrical barbecues and sporting fields for cricket and rugby. Tennis courts are also located adjacent to Cahill Park. Discovery Point Park is a privately owned park, which is open to the public, located along the Princes Highway and Brodie Sparks Drive. Discovery Point Park offers over three hectares of landscaped waterfront parklands, with provisions for walking and cycling. Other recreation facilities include Kogarah Golf Course, located along Marsh Street and the St George Rowing Club, on Levey Street. Have Wolli Creek Region Park can enjoy bushwalk and have picnic and barbecue.

Gallery

References

External links

Suburbs of Sydney
Bayside Council